Pat Piper may refer to:

 Pat Pieper (1886–1974), Chicago Cubs field (public address) announcer 
 Pat Piper (politician) (1934–2016), Minnesota politician